"Don't Go" is the first single released by Irish rock group Hothouse Flowers from their debut studio album, People (1988). Originally released in Ireland in 1987, the song peaked at number two on the Irish Singles Chart. The following year, after Hothouse Flowers played the song during their interval performance at the 1988 Eurovision Song Contest, the track charted in Ireland once more, reaching number two for a second time.

Worldwide, "Don't Go" reached the top 10 in New Zealand and Sweden as well as the top 40 in several other European countries. In the United States, the song did not chart on the Billboard Hot 100, but it did reach number seven on the Modern Rock Tracks chart and number 16 on the Album Rock Tracks chart. The single version of "Don't Go" is different from the LP version. It has never been released on CD.

Track listings

1987 release

7-inch single
A. "Don't Go"
B. "Better and Better"

12-inch single
A1. "Don't Go" (extended mix)
B1. "Big Fat Heart"
B2. "Better and Better"

10-inch single
A1. "Don't Go" (extended mix)
A2. "Better and Better"
B1. "Don't Go" (live acoustic version)
B2. "Lonely Lane" (live)

1988 release

7-inch and mini-CD single
 "Don't Go"
 "Saved"

12-inch single
A1. "Don't Go"
B1. "Saved"
B2. "Hydroman"

CD single and mini-album
 "Don't Go" – 3:29
 "Feet on the Ground" – 3:28
 "Lonely Lane" (live) – 5:25
 "Saved" – 3:37

CD Video single
 "Don't Go" (audio) – 3:32
 "I'm Sorry" (audio) – 3:35
 "Ballad of Katie" (audio) – 6:10
 "Don't Go" (video) – 3:12

Charts

Weekly charts

Year-end charts

Release history

In popular culture 
The song was performed by the Hothouse Flowers as the interval act of the 1988 Eurovision Song Contest held in Dublin, Ireland, which helped the band gain international recognition. The version used was the single version, not the LP mix, with the exception that the broadcast version was longer. The song is featured on an episode of the Irish sitcom Moone Boy.

References

1987 songs
1987 singles
1988 singles
Hothouse Flowers songs
London Records singles
Song recordings produced by Alan Winstanley
Song recordings produced by Clive Langer